This article lists events that occurred during 1989 in Estonia.

Incumbents

Events
 14 January – Estonian Olympic Committee is re-established. Now Estonian athletes can compete under Estonian flag.
 18 January – Estonian language was named to the state language and Estonian tricolor flag was reinstated as the official flag.

 March – elections to all-Union Congress of People's Deputies. Most of the Estonian seats (27 out of 36) were won by Estonian Popular Front (EPF), Intermovement won 5 seats. Estonian National Independence Party (ENIP) refused to participate on elections, but proposed an alternative parliament (Congress of Estonia).

 August – a new electoral law was proposed. The law tried to increase the residency requirements for voters and candidates. Due to strong opposition by ethnic Russians, the law didn't come into force.
 23 August – Two million indigenous people of Estonia, Latvia and Lithuania, then still occupied by the Soviet Union, joined hands to demand freedom and independence, forming an uninterrupted 600 km human chain called the Baltic Way.

 November – Estonian Supreme Soviet announced that the decision from the year 1940 (i.e the decision joining of Estonia to USSR) is annulled.

 After 44 years, the Estonian flag was raised on the Pikk Hermann castle tower.

Births
 4 January – Veiko Porkanen, actor
 20 January – Piret Krumm, actress
 4 February –
 Märt Pius, actor
 Priit Pius, actor
 8 February – Karl-Andreas Kalmet, actor
 2 April – Liis Lass, actress
 16 May – Pääru Oja, actor
 10 November – Adeele Sepp, actress

Deaths
14 December – Ants Eskola, actor and singer

See also
 1989 in Estonian television

References

 
1980s in Estonia
Estonia
Estonia
Years of the 20th century in Estonia